Choi Min-jeong (Hangul: 최민정; born 9 September 1998) is a South Korean short track speed skater. She is a three-time Olympic Champion (2018, 2022), a four-time World Champion (2015, 2016, 2018, 2022), Four Continents Champion (2020), and the current world record holder for 1500m. Along with Chun Lee-kyung and Jin Sun-yu, Choi is widely regarded as one of the best female Korean short track speed skaters of all time.

Career

Junior career
Choi won third overall behind teammates Noh Do-hee and Ahn Se-jung after winning 1000m gold and 1500m silver at the 2014 World Junior Championships.

Senior career
During the 2014–15 season at the senior level, Choi won her first World Cup gold medal ahead of  Arianna Fontana and Shim Suk-hee in Montréal. At just 16 years old, she took her first World title at the 2015 World Championships in Moscow after winning gold in 1000m and 3000m. A year later, she successfully defended her title in Seoul. During the 2016–17 season, Choi set a new world record time of 2:14:354 in 1500m in Salt Lake City.

In 2018, at the PyeongChang Winter Olympics, Choi became a two-time Olympic Champion after winning gold in the 1500m and 3000m relay. She set and currently holds the Olympic record in the 500m after breaking the previous Olympic record set by Elise Christie by 0.45 seconds. Choi was one of the big favourites heading to the A final, but she was penalized for interference having finished second. Choi went on to win the 1500m gold and led her team to the 3000m relay gold by more than eight seconds. She crashed and finished fourth after colliding with Shim Suk-hee in the 1000m finals.

Choi won her third overall World title at the 2018 World Championships, collecting 110 points overall after winning gold in the 500m, 1500m, and 3000m Superfinal.

At the inaugural 2020 Four Continents Championships, Choi had a clean sweep after winning gold medals in every distance. She was crowned the first-ever Four Continents overall champion after finishing first overall ahead of teammate Seo Whi-min and Courtney Sarault by a staggering margin of 89 and 92 points, respectively. The 2020 World Championships in Seoul was cancelled due to the COVID-19 pandemic and Choi withdrew from the 2021 World Championships due to the pandemic.

During the 2021–22 season, she suffered knee and ankle injuries in separate collisions during the October World Cup opener in Beijing. She was unable to compete in at the following World Cup event in Nagoya due to her injuries. Choi also had to deal with off-ice issues when the leaked text messages from her longtime teammate Shim implied that Shim tripped her on purpose during the match.

Choi competed for Korea at the 2022 Beijing Winter Olympic Games, winning gold in the 1500m, setting a new Olympic record in the quarterfinal. She also won two silver medals in the 1000m and women's 3000m relay.

Choi was crowned the world short track speed skating champion at the 2022 World Championships after winning gold in the 1000m, 1500m, and 3000m Superfinals. This is her first world title in four years (vice world champion in 2019, world championships cancelled in 2020, withdrew in 2021) and her fourth overall world title. She also anchored Team Korea in the women's 3000m relay from the bronze medal position to gold in the final curve of the relay with an incredible move, finishing 0.034 seconds ahead of Team Canada.

Personal life
Choi took up skating as a hobby at the age of six and joined a local club to pursue skating further when she was eight. Her inspiration came from watching Jin Sun-Yu's triple Olympic gold haul at the 2006 Winter Olympics. She is enrolled at Yonsei University, majoring in Sport Industry Studies.

Philanthropy
On 7 March 2022, Choi donated 50 million won to the Hope Bridge Disaster Relief Association to help the victims of the massive wildfire that started in Uljin, Gyeongbuk, and has spread to Samcheok, Gangwon.

Awards and nominations

References

External links

1998 births
Living people
South Korean female short track speed skaters
Olympic short track speed skaters of South Korea
Short track speed skaters at the 2018 Winter Olympics
Short track speed skaters at the 2022 Winter Olympics
People from Seongnam
Asian Games medalists in short track speed skating
Four Continents Short Track Speed Skating Championships medalists
Short track speed skaters at the 2017 Asian Winter Games
Asian Games gold medalists for South Korea
Asian Games silver medalists for South Korea
Asian Games bronze medalists for South Korea
Medalists at the 2017 Asian Winter Games
Medalists at the 2018 Winter Olympics
Medalists at the 2022 Winter Olympics
Olympic gold medalists for South Korea
Olympic silver medalists for South Korea
Olympic medalists in short track speed skating
World Short Track Speed Skating Championships medalists
Sportspeople from Gyeonggi Province
21st-century South Korean women
Competitors at the 2023 Winter World University Games
Medalists at the 2023 Winter World University Games
Universiade medalists in short track speed skating
Universiade gold medalists for South Korea